This is a list of submissions to the 78th Academy Awards for Best Foreign Language Film. The Academy of Motion Picture Arts and Sciences has invited the film industries of various countries to submit their best film for the Academy Award for Best Foreign Language Film every year since the award was created in 1956. The award is handed out annually by the Academy to a feature-length motion picture produced outside the United States that contains primarily non-English dialogue. The Foreign Language Film Award Committee oversees the process and reviews all the submitted films.

For the 78th Academy Awards, sixty-four countries submitted films to the Academy, and fifty-eight of those films were accepted for review by the Academy. The submissions of Austria and Greece were rejected before the formal review process and the submissions of Uruguay and Venezuela did not appear in the final list; meanwhile, those from Bolivia, Netherlands, Singapore and Tajikistan were later disqualified by the Academy. Costa Rica, Iraq and Fiji submitted films for the first time. The winner of the Academy Award for Best Foreign Language Film was South Africa's Tsotsi, which was directed by Gavin Hood.

Submissions

Notes

  Austria's submission, Caché, was disqualified because the film was completely in French, and not in a language indigenous to Austria.
  Bolivia's submission, Say Good Morning to Dad, was disqualified because a print of the film did not arrive at the Academy in time.
  Private was originally selected but the Academy informed Italy that the film would be disqualified for not being in Italian. The Italian Academy appealed the decision, but ended up selecting a new film
    Nepal elected to send Basain, but due to its release date, it was submitted the following year instead.
  The submission of the Netherlands, Bluebird, disqualified because it was too similar to a version previously aired on Dutch television; it was too late to select another Dutch film.
  Paradise Now was submitted as coming from "Palestine", which was used on the web page and the official notices of the Academy. It was announced at the awards ceremony as from "the Palestinian Territories".
  The Philippines failed to send a film for the first time in ten years; their Film Academy claimed they thought they hadn't been invited after the official invitation failed to reach their new address. 
  Singapore's submission, Be with Me, was disqualified after its official screening for being mostly in English and not in a Foreign Language
  Tajikistan's submission, Sex & Philosophy, was disqualified because a print of the film did not arrive at the Academy in time
  Uruguay reportedly selected Álvaro Buela's Alma Mater, but it only ended up sent to the Goya Awards.
  Venezuela selected 1888: The Extraordinary Voyage of the Santa Isabel, but their entry was delayed by a lawsuit and they missed the deadline   
 Among the other countries which were officially invited to submit a film, but did not, were Afghanistan, Algeria, Australia, Ecuador, Egypt, Lebanon, Macedonia, Malaysia, Ukraine and the United Kingdom.

References

78